Yokohama Customs Museum is a museum in Yokohama, Kanagawa, Japan. It is located in the ground floor of the historical Yokohama Customs Building, one of the Yokohama Three Towers.

References

Museums in Yokohama